Princess Guevarra, (born on March 7, 1999, in Imus, Cavite, Philippines), is a Filipino actress, and she is best known as one of the contestants in the 6th season of StarStruck, Guevarra signed a contract in GMA Artist Center in 2016.

Career

2016-present: Career Beginnings
Guevarra became known after joining the season 6 edition of GMA Network’s reality show, StarStruck. She then bagged minor roles in GMA Network shows such as That's My Amboy and D' Originals. Currently she is working as a flight attendant at AirAsia Philippines . She was also chosen as its goodwill ambassador together with Steve Dailisan.

Filmography

Television

References

External links

1999 births
Living people
Filipino television actresses
Filipino female dancers
GMA Network personalities
StarStruck (Philippine TV series) participants
Actresses from Cavite
People from Imus
Tagalog people